Massimo "Max" Pigoli (born 23 February 1958 in Menaggio) is an Italian auto racing driver. He presently competes in the Italian Superstars Series.

Career
Most of his career has been spent in touring car racing. He was independent champion in the Italian Superturismo Championship in 1997. Between 2003 and 2005 he competed in the Italian GT championship with a Porsche GT-3 RS. In 2006 he first competed in the Superstars Series, winning the drivers title in his debut year in a Jaguar S-Type. His best year since came in 2009, finishing third in the championship and runner-up in the International Superstars Series. For 2010 he drives for the Romeo Ferraris team with a Mercedes C63 AMG.

External links
Official website
Profile at Superstars Series official site

1958 births
Living people
Italian racing drivers
People from Menaggio
Superstars Series drivers
European Touring Car Championship drivers
Sportspeople from the Province of Como